Žensko košarkarsko društvo Ježica, commonly referred to as ŽKD Ježica or simply Ježica, is a Slovenian women's basketball club from the Ježica district in Ljubljana, currently playing in the Slovenian League. Through the 1990s, the club won eight league titles in a row, becoming a regular in the EuroLeague Women. However, the team declined after 2002, not winning any major honours since then.

Honours
Slovenian League
1992, 1993, 1994, 1995, 1996, 1997, 1998, 1999, 2001, 2002
Slovenian Cup
1992, 1993, 1994, 1995, 1996, 1997, 1998, 1999, 2000, 2001, 2002
Yugoslav Cup
1989

References

External links
Official website 

Ježica
Ježica
Basketball teams established in 1962
Sports clubs in Ljubljana
1962 establishments in Slovenia
Women's basketball teams in Yugoslavia